Nationality words link to articles with information on the nation's poetry or literature (for instance, Irish or France).

Events

Works published
 John Barbour, publication year conjectural, The Bruce, written 1376, posthumously published
 George Colclough, The Spectacle to Repentance
 Robert Henryson , translation in verse of Aesop's Fables, published  in Edinburgh, Scotland; new edition of a work originally published in 1450; the title page states: "Newlie corectit, and vendicat, fra mony errouris, quhilkis war ouer sene in the last prenting, quhair baith Lynes, and haill versis war left owt. Inprinted att Edinburgh be me Thomas Bassandyne, dwelland at the nether bow (anno.) 1571"
 Edward de Vere, 17th Earl of Oxford:
 "Letter to Bartholomew Clerke", a poem
 "Letter to Bedingfield", a poem
 Jan van der Noot, Het Bosken

Births
Death years link to the corresponding "[year] in poetry" article:
 Barnabe Barnes, baptised March 6; birth year disputed, 1568 and 1569 are also asserted (died 1609), English
 Trifone Bencio, flourished sometime after this year, Italian, Latin-language poet
 Judah Leone Modena, also known as Leon Modena or Yehudah Aryeh Mi-modena (died 1648), Venetian-born rabbi, orator, scholar, teacher and Hebrew-language poet
 Thomas Storer born about this year (died 1604), English

Deaths
Birth years link to the corresponding "[year] in poetry" article:
 July 17 – Georg Fabricius (born 1516), German poet and historian
 November 24 – Jan Blahoslav (born 1523), Czech poet and translator
 date not known – Lodovico Castelvetro (born c. 1505), Italian literary critic

See also

 Poetry
 16th century in poetry
 16th century in literature
 Dutch Renaissance and Golden Age literature
 Elizabethan literature
 French Renaissance literature
 Renaissance literature
 Spanish Renaissance literature

Notes

16th-century poetry
Poetry